Goesdorf is a commune and village in north-western Luxembourg. It is part of the canton of Wiltz.

, the village of Goesdorf, which lies in the south of the commune, had a population of 238.  Other towns within the commune include Buderscheid, Dahl, Nocher, and Nocher-Route.

Population

References

External links
 

Villages in Luxembourg
Communes in Wiltz (canton)